Headlong Hall is a novella by Thomas Love Peacock, his first long work of fiction, written in 1815 and published in 1816.

As in his later novel Crotchet Castle, Peacock assembles a group of eccentrics, each with a single monomaniacal obsession, and derives humor and social satire from their various interactions and conversations.  The setting is the country estate of Squire Harry Headlong Ap-Rhaiader, Esq., in Wales.

Plot
Four visitors arrive at Headlong Hall: "Mr. Foster, the perfectibilian; Mr. Escot, the deteriorationist; Mr. Jenkins, the statu-quoite; and the Reverend Doctor Gaster, who though of course neither a philosopher nor a man of taste, had so won the Squire's fancy by a learned dissertation on the art of stuffing a turkey, that he concluded no Christmas party would be complete without him." At the Hall, they find further guests, including phrenologist Mr. Cranium, philosopher Mr. Panscope, amateur musician Mr. Chromatic, and Miss Philomela Poppyseed, a popular novelist. Squire Headlong leads the throng through a series of dinners and Christmas celebrations, although the chief focus of the story is the running thread of conversation between the various exponents of their respective views. By the final morning of the party, four couples have become engaged, and Reverend Gaster performs a wedding ceremony for them. The guests disperse, promising to meet again in summer.

Neologisms

They refer to the structure of the human body; they are adjectives compounded by stringing together classical terms that describe the body, using ancient Greek terms for the first word and Latin for the second.

References

External links
 Text of Headlong Hall, at the T. L. Peacock Society
 

1816 British novels
Novels by Thomas Love Peacock
Novels set in Wales
British novellas
British comedy novels